The banknotes of Denmark, 1972 series are part of the physical form of Denmark's currency, the Krone (kr). They have been issued solely by Danmarks Nationalbank since 1 August 1818. They are still valid but are no longer printed. The theme of the notes is paintings by Jens Juel (1745–1802) of various more or less famous people on the front sides and common animals in Denmark on the back sides.

Banknotes, 1972 series

10 kroner

Issued on 8 April 1975 – out of print as of 11 March 1980 and replaced by a coin.
Features Cathrine Sophie Kirchhoff, née Christensen, married to Councillor of State J. H. Kirchhoff and a female common eider painted by Johannes Larsen (1867–1961).

20 kroner

Issued on 11 March 1980 – out of print as of 10 April 1990 and replaced by a coin.
It features Pauline Tutein, née Tath, and two house sparrows drawn by Gunnar Larsen (1919–1981).
It was part of an April Fools' Day hoax in Denmark in which all notes on which the two sparrows only showed 3 legs were said to be counterfeited. On all notes the sparrows only show 3 legs.

50 kroner

Issued on 21 January 1975 – out of print as of 7 May 1999.
Features Engelke Charlotte Ryberg, née Falbe, and a Crucian carp drawn by Ib Andersen (1907–1969).

100 kroner

Issued on 22 October 1974 – out of print as of 22 November 1999.
It came in an updated version in 1995 with additional security features.
It features a self-portrait by Jens Juel and a red underwing drawn by Ib Andersen.

500 kroner

Issued on 18 April 1972 – out of print as of 12 September 1997.
Features Franziska Genoveva von Qualen, née d'Abbestée, and a sand lizard drawn by Ib Andersen.

1000 kroner

Issued on 11 March 1975 – out of print as of 18 September 1998.
Features Thomasine Heiberg, née Buntzen, mother-in-law to Johanne Luise Heiberg on the 200 kroner note, 1997 series, and a red squirrel drawn by Ib Andersen.

References

Banknotes of Denmark